Farruko Presenta: Los Menores is the third studio album by Puerto Rican singer Farruko. It was released on 27 October 2014, by Carbon Fiber Music and Universal Music Latino.

Track listing

Charts

Weekly charts

Year-end charts

References 

2014 albums
Farruko albums
Reggaeton albums
Universal Music Latino albums